The latest statistics for Islam in Paraguay estimate a total Muslim population of under 1000 representing 0.02% of the population. But, another estimates puts the number of Muslim members in Paraguay at 35.000 peoples. Most of the Muslims are descendants of immigrants from Syria and Lebanon. The 
major Islamic organization in Paraguay is the Centro Benéfico Cultural Islámico Asunción, led by Faozi Mohamed Omairi. The community is concentrated in and around the capital, Asuncion.

References 

Paraguay
Religion in Paraguay
Paraguary